Johnny and the Dead (1993) is the second novel by Terry Pratchett to feature the character Johnny Maxwell. The other novels in the Johnny Maxwell Trilogy are Only You Can Save Mankind (1992) and Johnny and the Bomb (1996). In this story, Johnny sees and speaks with the spirits (they object to the term "ghost") of those interred in his local cemetery and tries to help them when their home is threatened.

Johnny and the Dead is a feature of some schools' English curriculum.

Plot summary
The story starts with Johnny Maxwell, a 12-year-old boy, taking a shortcut through the local Blackbury cemetery to reach his home. In the cemetery, Johnny meets the spirit of Alderman Thomas Bowler and realizes that he can interact with the spirits of the dead. Later, Johnny meets all the deceased occupants of the cemetery and discusses with them the council's sale of Blackbury's neglected cemetery to a faceless conglomerate, who plan to build offices on it. Various dead citizens, led by a former town councillor, ask Johnny to help stop it.

While Johnny (helped by his semi-believing friends) tries to find evidence of famous internees and speaks out at community meetings, the dead begin to take an interest in modern-day life and realise they are not, as they once believed, trapped in the cemetery.

Finally the council is forced to back down, but the dead are no longer interested; they have decided that instead of waiting for the Day of Judgement, they will make the decision themselves. Most of them depart the cemetery to continue their journey into the afterlife but, thanks to the campaigning of the Blackbury Volunteers, the town's living residents have rediscovered the cemetery as a link to their past. As one of the dead puts it before leaving: "The living must remember, and the dead must forget."

Ideas and themes
The book is loosely based on real events in Westminster in the 1980s, when the council sold three cemeteries as building land for 15p (Pratchett was working as a journalist at this time).

Part of the story deals with the last surviving member of the Blackbury pals, a Pals battalion with obvious parallel to the Accrington Pals. This man is called Tommy Atkins, the name given to the generic British soldier of the day.

A running joke in the book is that most of the Dead are "nearly famous", often being recognisable as very similar to a famous Briton. It is possible that Pratchett intends Blackbury Cemetery to be "nearly Highgate", especially as one of the most prominent ghosts (William Stickers) is described as "The man who would have invented communism if Karl Marx hadn't."

Adaptations
 The book was made into a TV serial for Children's ITV on ITV in 1995. It starred Andrew Falvey as Johnny, and featured Brian Blessed as William Stickers and George Baker as Alderman Bowler.
 It was also adapted as a play by Stephen Briggs.

Translations
Johnny et les morts (French)
Nur Du kannst sie verstehen (i.e. "Only You Can Understand Them", German)
Johnny och döden (Swedish)
Джонни и мертвецы (Russian)
Johnny ve Ölüler (Turkish)
Joni a'r Meirwon (Welsh)
Johnny i zmarli (Polish)
Johnny a mŕtvi (Slovak)
Johnny y los muertos (Spanish)

External links
 

1993 British novels
Children's fantasy novels
ITV children's television shows
Novels by Terry Pratchett
Johnny Maxwell
British children's novels
1993 children's books
1995 British television series debuts
1995 British television series endings
1990s British children's television series
1990s British television miniseries
British fantasy television series
Television series by ITV Studios
London Weekend Television shows
English-language television shows
Doubleday (publisher) books